The Diocese of Kyiv and Chernihiv or Diocese of  Kyiv–Černihiv was a Roman Catholic ecclesiastical territory in the city of Kyiv in the north central part of Ukraine on the Dnieper River. It was suppressed in 1798.

History
1321: Established as Diocese of Kyiv
1638: Renamed as Diocese of Kyiv and Chernihiv
1798 Aug 8: Suppressed to establish the Diocese of Lutsk and Zytomierz

Ordinaries

Diocese of Kyiv
Erected: 1321
Latin Name: Kioviensis

Henri, O.P.  (15 Dec 1320 Appointed - 1350 Died)
...
Józef Wereszczyński  (5 Jun 1592 - 1599 Died)
Krzysztof Kazimirski  (5 May 1599 - 1618 Died)
Bogusław Radoszewski  (17 Jan 1619 - 6 Jun 1633 Appointed, Bishop of Lutsk)
Andrzej Szołdrski  (9 Jan 1634 - 13 Aug 1635 Appointed, Bishop of Przemyśl)
Alexander Sokołowski  (21 Jul 1636 - 9 May 1645 Died)

Diocese of Kyiv and Chernihiv
Name Changed: 1638
Latin Name: Kioviensis seu Chioviensis

Stanisław Zaremba, O. Cist.  (23 Apr 1646 - 3 Aug 1653 Died)
Jan Leszczyński  (21 Apr 1655 - 10 Jan 1656 Appointed, Bishop of Chelmno)
Tomasz Wieyski (Ujejski)  (3 Apr 1656 - 12 Jun 1679 Resigned)
Jan Stanisław Witwicki  (12 Jun 1679 - 25 May 1682 Appointed, Bishop of Lutsk)
Andrzej Chryzostom Załuski  (15 Nov 1683 - 15 Oct 1692 Appointed, Bishop of Płock)
Mikołaj Stanisław Święcicki  (25 Feb 1697 - 18 May 1699 Appointed, Bishop of Poznań)
Jan Gomoliński  (30 Mar 1700 - Sep 1714 Died)
Valentinus Matthias Arcemberski  (29 May 1715 - 1717 Died)
Jan Joachim Tarło  (5 Dec 1718 - 15 Mar 1723 Confirmed, Bishop of Poznań)
Samuel Ozga  (27 Sep 1723 - 19 Apr 1756 Died)
Kajetan Ignacy Sołtyk  (19 Apr 1756 - 12 Feb 1759 Confirmed, Bishop of Kraków)
Józef Andrzej Załuski  (24 Sep 1759 - 7 Jan 1774 Died)
Franciszek Kandyd Ossoliński, O.F.M. Conv.  (7 Jan 1774 - 7 Aug 1784 Died)
Kasper Kazimierz Kolumna Cieciszowski  (7 Aug 1784 - 17 Nov 1798 Appointed, Bishop of Lutsk and Zhytomyr)

See also
Catholic Church in Ukraine

References

Former Roman Catholic dioceses in Europe